Namatjira is a genus of grasshoppers in the family Morabidae. There are at least two described species in Namatjira, found in Australia.

Species
These two species belong to the genus Namatjira:
 Namatjira aliciae Key, 1976
 Namatjira centralis (Rehn, 1952)

References

Caelifera